Sainte-Anne is a city in the southern part of Grande-Terre, Guadeloupe in the French West Indies It is one of the most popular tourist destinations of the island, along with Le Gosier and Saint-François).

The commune has developed its tourist infrastructure in recent decades, but still remains dependent on agriculture.

Population

Education
Public preschools include:
 Ecole maternelle Marcelle Borifax
 Ecole maternelle Gontran Jhigai
 Ecole maternelle Emmanuel Vilus
 Ecole maternelle Saturnin Palmier
 Ecole maternelle Lacavé Paul
 Ecole maternelle St-Pierre Phirmis
 Ecole maternelle Georges Troupé
 Ecole maternelle Urbino-Camprasse

Public primary schools include:
 Ecole primaire Rigobert Anzala
 Ecole primaire Lucie Calendrier Bicep
 Ecole primaire Florent Donnat
 Ecole primaire Albert Lazard
 Ecole primaire Ginette Maragnes
 Ecole primaire Raymond et Gisèle Mathurine
 Ecole primaire Richard Pierrot
 Ecole primaire Victor Valier

Public junior high schools include:
 Collège Eugène Yssap
 Collège Olympe Rame Decorbin

Public senior high schools include:
 LGT Yves Leborgne

See also
Communes of the Guadeloupe department

References

External links

Official website 
Sainte-Anne History 

Communes of Guadeloupe